William Kingsley,  D.D. was  an Anglican priest in the 17th century.

Lever was  born in London and educated at Magdalen College, Oxford. He was Archdeacon of Canterbury from 1595 until his death on 29 March 1619.

Notes

17th-century English Anglican priests
16th-century English Anglican priests
Archdeacons of Canterbury
Alumni of Magdalen College, Oxford
1619 deaths